Americana de Aviación was an airline based in Peru.

Code information
ICAO Code: ANE
IATA Code: 8A
Call Sign: Americana

Company history
Americana de Aviación was founded in 1990 and began operations in 1991 using a Boeing 727-077 with regional routes within Peru.  
Founders were: Juan Manuel Pereira Medina (President-Founder) and Victor D. Ortiz de Villate (General Manager). In 1991, they sold their majority stock participation to Luis Chan Lay who named his partner, Leandro Chiok Chang (new Executive President), as his front man.
In 1994, the Peruvian Government grounded all B727-100s older than 20 years and Americana saw its aircraft grounded.  Soon, the 727s were replaced with Boeing 737-200s but bad administration by the new owners and a bad financial picture in South America, saw Americana forced to cease operations by 1997.

Destinations
 Lima
 Arequipa
 Ayacucho
 Chiclayo
 Cuzco
 Juliaca
 Piura
 Pucallpa
 Puerto Maldonado
 Tacna
 Trujillo
 Tumbes
 Iquitos
 Salta
 Cordova

Fleet details
1 - Boeing 727-023
3 - Boeing 727-027
1 - Boeing 727-41
2 - Boeing 727-077
1 - Boeing 727-162
1 - Boeing 727-230
1 - Boeing 737-205
1 - Boeing 737-281
1 - Boeing 737-293
1 - Fokker F28 Fellowship (leased from Peruvian Air Force in 1993 and 1996)

References

External links

Defunct airlines of Peru
Airlines established in 1990
Airlines disestablished in 1997